The men's downhill competition at the 2002 Asian Games in Gijang County was held on 10 October at the Gijang Mountain Bike Race Stadium.

Schedule
All times are Korea Standard Time (UTC+09:00)

Results

Qualification

Final

References

External links
Qualification Results
Final Results

Mountain Men Downhill